Dafydd Llwyd Mathau (fl. 1601–1629) was a 17th-century Welsh poet and strolling minstrel. It was thought by the bibliographer John Humphreys Davies (1871–1926) that he may have been from the Llangeitho area of Ceredigion (Cardiganshire).

Poetry
Mathau's works, written in Welsh, include poems in praise of several prominent Welsh families and a number of love poems. He is also known to have composed an awdl-style verse in 1611.

References

Welsh male poets
17th-century Welsh poets
17th-century male writers